The Dos Erres massacre of 6 December 1982 took place in Dos Erres, a small village in the municipality of La Libertad, in the northern Petén department of Guatemala. The name of the village, occasionally given as "Las Dos Erres", literally means "two Rs", originating from two brothers called Ruano who received the original land grant.

On 6 December 1982, during the de facto presidency of General Efraín Ríos Montt, over 200 people were killed in Dos Erres by commandos working as government forces as a part of the government's scorched earth policy, in which up to 200,000 indigenous and Mayan people died.

In December 2011, President Álvaro Colom made a formal apology for the massacre on behalf of the Guatemalan government and months later four soldiers were sentenced to 6,060 years prison for their part in the massacre. In March 2012, a fifth soldier, Pedro Pimentel Rios, was further sentenced to 6,060 years in prison for his participation in the events. Jorge Vinicio Sosa Orantes, "one of the lieutenants" of the commandos, was found guilty in Fall 2013 of immigration fraud in a court in California.

The events of December 1982
In October 1982, guerrillas ambushed an army convoy near Palestina, in the vicinity of Dos Erres. They killed 21 soldiers and took 19 rifles. On 4 December, a contingent of 58 Kaibiles (the elite special forces commandos of the Guatemalan Army) was flown into the area. The following day, they received orders to disguise themselves as guerrillas, deploy to Dos Erres and kill the inhabitants, who were considered guerrilla sympathizers. Dressed as guerrillas, the Kaibiles arrived in the hamlet at 02:30 hrs on 6 December. They forced the inhabitants out of their homes, corralling the men in the schoolhouse and the women and children in the hamlet's two churches. A subsequent search uncovered no sign of weapons or guerrilla propaganda. At 06:00, officers consulted superiors by radio, then informed the commandos they would be "vaccinating" the inhabitants after breakfast.

In the early afternoon, the Kaibiles separated out the children, and began killing them. They raped women and girls, and ripped the fetuses out of pregnant women. They bashed the smallest children's heads against walls and trees, and killed the older ones with hammer blows to the head. A baby was the first to be killed, by dumping the baby live into a deep 4 meter well, along with the rest of the bodies then after. Then the commandos interrogated the men and women one by one, raped some of the women again, then shot or bashed them with the hammer, and dumped them in the well. The massacre continued throughout 7 December. On the morning of 8 December, as the Kaibiles were preparing to leave, another 15 persons, among them children, arrived in the hamlet. With the well already full, they took the newcomers to a location half an hour away, then shot all but two of them. They kept two teenage girls for the next few days, raping them repeatedly and finally strangling them. Only one person survived this massacre, a small child who managed to escape.

Judicial proceedings 
In 1994 a case was presented in Guatemala to investigate and bring to trial those responsible for the massacre. However, the case remained paralyzed in Guatemala's justice system and showed no signs of progress.

In 2000, President Alfonso Portillo admitted government responsibility for the massacre. He acknowledged the deaths of 226 victims at the hands of state agents, asked for forgiveness on behalf of the state, and presented survivors' groups with a cheque totaling US$1.82 million.

In 2009, the IACHR held that the amnesty law of 1996 did not apply to the most serious crimes committed during the civil war. This was followed by investigations in the United States against people suspected of involvement in the massacre. In May 2010, Gilberto Jordan, naturalized American and former member of the Kaibiles special forces, was accused of involvement in the massacre and arrested in Florida by U.S. Immigration and Customs officers. On 16 September 2010, after his role in the massacre was established in a Miami court, Jordan was convicted for naturalization fraud and sentenced to 10 years in prison.

In January 2011, Jorge Vinicio Orantes Sosa, another former Kaibil member suspected to be involved in the massacre, was arrested in Alberta on charges of lying to immigration authorities. In September 2011, US authorities formally requested Sosa's extradition from Canada to the United States to face charges of making a false statement and unlawful procurement of citizenship, with regards to his arrival from Guatemala to the United States a few years after the massacre. Sosa, who holds both Canadian and American citizenship is also wanted by Guatemalan authorities. On 21 September 2012, Canada extradited Sosa to the United States, where he stood trial for immigration fraud. He was found guilty and received a 10-year sentence. Sosa also had his US citizenship revoked. He was released from prison on 26 July 2019. Sosa is now residing in Canada, and has yet to be deported.

On 25 July 2011, the office of Attorney General Claudia Paz y Paz began a trial in Guatemala City against four former soldiers of the Kaibiles special forces accused of participating in the massacre. On 2 August 2011, a court found the four soldiers, Manuel Pop, Reyes Collin Gualip, Daniel Martínez Hernández and Lieutenant Carlos Carías guilty of the massacre. They were each sentenced to over 6,000 years in prison.

On 12 March 2012, Pedro Pimentel Rios was sentenced to a symbolic 6,060 years in prison for his part in the massacre. 
On 25 May 2012, the American public radio show This American Life aired an episode entitled "What Happened at Dos Erres" which covered the story of a survivor of the massacre, Oscar Ramirez. It was based on a series of articles by ProPublica, which later served as the basis for a 2017 documentary called "Finding Oscar."

A sixth former soldier, Santos Lopez, was convicted of killing 171 people during the massacre. He was sentenced in November 2018 to a symbolic 5,160 years in prison. Among those who testified against him was Ramiro Osorio Cristales, who was 5 years old when his family was murdered during the massacre. Lopez subsequently kidnapped and raised Cristales in an abusive household for the next 13 years. Cristales eventually escaped and sought asylum in Canada, where he currently resides.

On 3 March 2020, Gilberto Jordan, 64, was removed by officers with U.S. Immigration and Customs Enforcement's (ICE) Enforcement and Removal Operations (ERO) in Miami. Gilberto Jordan, arrived in Guatemala escorted by ERO officers. Upon arrival, Jordan was immediately turned over to Guatemalan law enforcement officials.

References

The earliest version of the massacre narrative was modified and edited from Guatemala: Kaibiles and the Massacre at Las Dos Erres, a public domain information request response document of the U.S. Citizenship and Immigration Services.

External links
What Happened At Dos Erres?, This American Life May 2012
Finding Oscar: Massacre, Memory and Justice in Guatemala, ProPublica
How the Media Got Guatemala's Dos Erres Massacre Wrong. The Real News, 2 August 2013
Adopted By The Man Who Killed My Family. BBC World Service (Witness programme), 6 December 2018

Conflicts in 1982
History of Petén
Massacres in Guatemala
Massacres in 1982
1980s murders in Guatemala 
1982 crimes in Guatemala